James A. "Bubber" Epps (born September 7, 1943) is an American politician. Epps is a retired paving contractor, living in Dry Branch. He previously served as a member of the Georgia House of Representatives from the 144th District, serving from 2008 until Jan. 14, 2019. He is a member of the Republican party.

Biography
He was born in Bibb County and graduated from Twiggs County High School. He studied at Brewton Parker College and Mercer University, gaining a Bachelor of Science in Political Science and a master's degree in Education.  fHe spent the early years of his adult life in education working at the University of Georgia and then joined his family's paving business, Epps Brothers Construction Company, Inc. where he retired in 2007.

He is married to Kathryn. They have three children, eight grandchildren and two great grandchildren. Epps is a lifelong member and a Deacon of Antioch Baptist Church in Dry Branch.

Political career
Epps has represented the 144th district, covering Bleckley, Twiggs and Wilkinson Counties as well as parts of Bibb, Houston, Jones and Laurens Counties, since 2009.

He is chairman of the House Motor Vehicles Committee and secretary of the House Transportation Committee.

References

Living people
Members of the Georgia House of Representatives
Georgia (U.S. state) Republicans
1943 births
People from Macon, Georgia
Georgia (U.S. state) Democrats
21st-century American politicians